Patrik Prikryl (born 19 September 1992) is a Slovak professional footballer who currently plays for FK Pohronie.

Club career

1. FC Tatran Prešov
Prikryl made his professional Fortuna Liga debut for Tatran Prešov against Železiarne Podbrezová on 18 February 2018.

References

External links
 1. FC Tatran Prešov official club profile
 
 Ligy.sk profile
 Futbalnet profile

1992 births
Living people
Sportspeople from Banská Bystrica
Slovak footballers
Association football defenders
FK Pohronie players
1. FC Tatran Prešov players
FK Dukla Banská Bystrica players
2. Liga (Slovakia) players
Slovak Super Liga players